is a former Japanese football player who last featured for Giravanz Kitakyushu.

Club statistics
Updated to 2 February 2018.

References

External links
Profile at Giravanz Kitakyushu

1985 births
Living people
University of Teacher Education Fukuoka alumni
Association football people from Ōita Prefecture
Japanese footballers
J1 League players
J2 League players
J3 League players
Japan Football League players
Ventforet Kofu players
V-Varen Nagasaki players
Giravanz Kitakyushu players
Association football midfielders